Christoforos Robinson (born 18 August 1972) is a Greek baseball player who competed in the 2004 Summer Olympics.

References

1972 births
Living people
Greek baseball players
Olympic baseball players of Greece
Baseball players at the 2004 Summer Olympics
Panathinaikos Baseball players